The Pratt & Whitney Canada PT6T Twin-Pac is a turboshaft engine designed for helicopters. Manufactured by Pratt & Whitney Canada, its first application was in the Bell 212 and UH-1N Twin Huey helicopter family. The PT6T Twin-Pac consists of two PT6A power turbines driving a common output reduction gearbox, producing up to 2,000 hp at 6,000 rpm. The engine is designated T400 by the U.S. military.

Development

The U.S. military came very close to not procuring the UH-1N Twin Huey because of the PT6T. The purchase of the aircraft for U.S. military use was opposed by the Chairman of the House Armed Services Committee at the time, Mendel Rivers. Rivers took this position because the PT6T was produced in Canada. The Canadian government had not supported U.S. involvement in Vietnam, and had opposed U.S. policies in southeast Asia, as well as accepting U.S. draft dodgers. Rivers was also concerned that procurement of the engines would result in a negative trade deficit situation with Canada. Congress only approved the purchase when it was assured that a U.S. source would be found for the PT6T engines. This source was Pratt & Whitney Engine Services in Bridgeport, West Virginia, which was established in 1971 to assemble and test new T400-WV-402 engines. As a result, the U.S. military ordered 294 Bell 212s under the designation UH-1N, with deliveries commencing in 1970.

Variants

PT6T-3
Basic production model
PT6T-3A
Same as the PT6T-3 but with aluminum (instead of magnesium) gearbox casting, No longer used.
PT6T-3B
Same as the PT6T-3, except for the single power section contingency ratings and has PT6T-6 compressor turbine components.
PT6T-3BE
Same as the PT6T-3B with the removal of the torque sharing function in the torque control and is a PT6T-3BE gearbox fitted with two PT6T-3B power sections.
PT6T-3BF
Similar to the PT6T-3B, except 30-minute one engine inoperative (OEI) rating is equivalent to the 2½ minute OEI rating.
PT6T-3BG
Similar to the PT6T-3BE, except 30 minute OEI rating is equivalent to the 2½ minute OEI rating.
PT6T-3D
Same as the PT6T-3B, except for improved hot section hardware to allow for increased ratings.
PT6T-3DE
Same as the PT6T-3D, except the continuous OEI rating is replaced by a 30 minutes rating.
PT6T-3DF
Same as the PT6T-3DE, except for improved hot section hardware to allow for increased ratings.
PT6T-6
Same as the PT6T-3, except for the 2½ min rating and higher ratings and improved engine parts.
PT6T-6B
Same as the PT6T-6 with the removal of the torque sharing function in the torque control and is a PT6T-6B gearbox with two PT6T-6 power sections.
PT6T-9
Similar to the PT6T-3DF, except for an improved hot section and it is equipped with an engine electronic control system.
T400-C-400
Military PT6T-3
T400-CP-401
Military variant used on the VH-1N variant of the UH-1N.
T400-WV-402
Military PT6T-6, assembled by Pratt & Whitney Engine Services, Inc. in West Virginia

Applications
 Bell 212 
 Bell 309 
 Bell 412
 Bell AH-1J and AH-1T SeaCobra
 Bell CH-146 Griffon
 Bell UH-1N Twin Huey
 Sikorsky S-58T
 Sikorsky S-69

Specifications

See also

References

External links

 Pratt & Whitney Canada PT6T page
 Transport Canada — Type Certificate Data Sheet
 U.S. Federal Aviation Administration — Type Certificate Data Sheet E22EA
 Technical and Regulatory Documents

1960s turboprop engines
Pratt & Whitney Canada aircraft engines